Donald John Lockhart (February 28, 1931 – April 6, 1982), was a Canadian ice hockey player who was a member of the Canadian team at the 1954 Ice Hockey World Championships in Stockholm, Sweden, and won a silver medal.

Career 
Lockhart played ice hockey for the Toronto Marlboros juniors and seniors, then moved on to the Moncton Hawks, Glace Bay Miners and Niagara Falls Cataracts. When the East York Lyndhursts were selected to represent Canada at the 1954 Championships, Lockhart was added as a backup goaltender for the team and played two games.

References

1931 births
1982 deaths
Canadian ice hockey goaltenders
East York Lyndhursts players
Ice hockey people from Toronto